Hilton Curran (15 November 1914 – 31 May 1987) was an Australian rugby league footballer who played in the 1930s.

Curran came to the St. George club via the Tumut rugby league football club. 

A talented winger with a turn of speed, Curran stayed one season with the Saints in 1938. He later served in Australian in the Army during World War Two. 

Curran died at Maroubra, New South Wales on 31 May 1987.

References

St. George Dragons players
Australian rugby league players
Rugby league wingers
1914 births
1987 deaths
Australian Army personnel of World War II
Australian Army soldiers
People from Adelong, New South Wales